Otocinclus vestitus is a species of catfish in the family Loricariidae. It is native to South America, where it occurs in the basins of the Amazon River and the Paraná River. It reaches 3.2 cm (1.3 inches) SL. The species is sometimes found in the aquarium trade, where it is most frequently known as the dwarf otocinclus, a name which is also used for other related catfish species, not all of which are actually in the genus Otocinclus.

References 

Hypoptopomatini
Fish described in 1872
Fauna of South America
Taxa named by Edward Drinker Cope